Eqrem Basha (born 1948 in Debar, PR Macedonia, FPR Yugoslavia) is among the most respected contemporary writers of Kosovo in recent years. His life and literary production are intimately linked to Kosovo and its capital Pristina, where he has lived and worked since the 1970s.

Career
It was in the early 1970s, during Kosovo's most prominent period, that Eqrem Basha moved to Pristina to study language and literature at the newly created Albanian language university there. He later worked for Pristina television as editor of the drama section, but was fired for political reasons. Basha is the author of eight volumes of innovative verse spanning the years from 1971 to 1995, three volumes of short stories and numerous translations (in particular French literature and drama).

He works at the publishing industry in Pristina. Eqrem Basha is an enigmatic poet. Perplexing, fascinating, and difficult to classify in a literary sense, he succeeds in transmitting a certain mystique to the inquisitive reader. At one moment he seems coolly logical and shows an admirable ability to reason deductively, and the next moment he is overcome by absurd flights of fancy into a surrealistic world where apparently nothing makes any sense. Basha has an urbane view of things and delights in the daily absurdities of life. Nothing could be more foreign to him than the inspiration many of his fellow poets derive from the rich folklore traditions of the northern mountain tribes and verse of social commitment. His verse is light, colloquial and much less declamatory than that of many of his predecessors.

References
Albanian literature from Robert Elsie

Living people
1948 births
Kosovan writers
People from Debar
Kosovan translators
Members of the Academy of Sciences and Arts of Kosovo